The 2017 Derry Senior Football Championship was the 94th edition of Derry GAA's premier gaelic football tournament for senior clubs in Derry Football League Division 1. The winners received the John McLaughlin Cup.

Slaughtneil were the defending champions, having won their third title in-a row by beating The Loup in the 2016 final by 2-11 to 0-6. On 24 September 2017 they won "4-in-a-row" by defeating Ballinascreen 4-12 to 1-11 in the final in Celtic Park.

Format

Current format

The senior championship reverted to a straight knock out in 2016 and continues with minor alterations. At the end of each round, a draw was held to determine the fixtures in the next round.

In Derry, relegation or promotion within the league system determines which championship clubs compete in – Division 1 teams compete in the senior championship, Division 2 teams in the intermediate championship and Division 3 teams in the junior championship.

Previous Formats

A  back-door format was used from 2009 to 2015. Four initial ‘round-robin’ groups progressing to an eight team straight knockout were used in seasons 2007 and 2008.

Recent history of relegations and promotions

Relegations and promotions in 2017

 After Division 1 football ended on 6 August 2017, Swatragh were 15th in the table with eight points and Banagher were 16th with six points. Swatragh were initially penalised three league points for not fielding against Coleraine which would have meant that Swatragh were relegated. The three point penalty was subsequently overturned and Banagher were relegated.
 Newbridge won Division 2 in 2017 and were promoted to Division 1 and the 2018 senior championship.

Relegations and promotions in 2016

 Newbridge finished bottom (i.e. 16th) in Division 1 in 2016 and were relegated to Division 2.
 Glenullin won Division 2 in 2016 and were promoted to Division 1 for 2017. They applied to compete in the 2016 senior championship and were allowed to do so.

Relegations and promotions in 2015

 Foreglen finished in the bottom two in Division 1 in 2015 and were relegated to Division 2 following their loss to Glenullin in the Division 1 relegation playoff.
 Glenullin finished in the bottom two in Division 1 in 2015 and were relegated to Division 2 following their loss to Claudy in the Division 1/Division 2 relegation/promotion playoff. Glenullin successfully applied to be allowed to play in the 2016 senior football championship.
 Greenlough won Division 2 in 2015 and were promoted to Division 1 for 2016.
 Claudy finished second in Division 2 in 2015 and were promoted to Division 1 following their victory over Glenullin in the Division 1/Division 2 relegation/promotion playoff.

Senior Championship Draw

First round

Quarter-finals

Semi-finals

Final

Top Scorers

Ulster Senior Club Football Championship

References

Derry Senior Football Championship
Derry Senior Football Championship